Start Stadium was a stadium in Saransk, Russia. It had a capacity of 11,613 spectators and it was the home stadium of FC Mordovia Saransk of the Russian Premier League.

References

Football venues in Russia
FC Mordovia Saransk
Sport in Saransk
Buildings and structures in Mordovia
Tourist attractions in Mordovia
Sports venues completed in 2004
2004 establishments in Russia